"Somebody Save Me" is the third single from American glam metal band Cinderella's triple platinum album Night Songs. Released on February 10, 1987, after Night Songs had already peaked at number 3, the song reached number 66 on the Billboard Hot 100 chart. Journalist Thom Jurek described the song as a "riotous call for free living no matter the consequences of the next day."

Music video
The video shows the band at a studio then performing on stage. They later can be shown doing sexy dance moves, like grinding and hip thrusting. At the end of the video, Jon Bon Jovi and Richie Sambora are seen outside of the studio; this shows and the sisters are fans of Bon Jovi instead. The video was also featured on an episode of Beavis and Butthead.

Charts

References

1987 singles
Cinderella (band) songs
1986 songs
Songs written by Tom Keifer
Mercury Records singles